The 1985–86 Cypriot Fourth Division was the 1st season of the Cypriot fourth-level football league. The championship was split into three geographical groups, representing the Districts of Cyprus. The winners were:
 Nicosia-Keryneia Group: OXEN Peristeronas
 Larnaca-Famagusta Group: Dynamo Pervolion
 Limassol-Paphos Group: APEI Ipsona

The three winners were promoted to the 1986–87 Cypriot Third Division. No team were relegated to regional leagues.

See also
 Cypriot Fourth Division
 1985–86 Cypriot First Division
 1985–86 Cypriot Cup

Cypriot Fourth Division seasons
Cyprus
1985–86 in Cypriot football